Wanting is a 2008 novel by Australian author Richard Flanagan.

Plot summary
Wanting cuts between two stories based on real historical figures under the central theme of 'wanting' and is set in both nineteenth century Tasmania and Britain. One tells the tale of an Aboriginal child, Mathinna, adopted by then governor of Van Diemen’s Land, Sir John Franklin and his wife Lady Jane; the other of Charles Dickens’ love affair with Ellen Ternan after one of his daughters dies.

Reception
Many critics regarded Wanting one of the best novels of the year.

Notes
Dedication: "For Kevin Perkins".
Epigraph: "You see, reason, gentlemen, is a fine thing, that is unquestionable, but reason is only reason and satisfies only man's reasoning capacity, while wanting is a manifestation of the whole of life." Fyodor Dostoevsky
Epigraph: "That which is wanting cannot be numbered." Ecclesiastes

Awards
2008 Western Australia Premier's Prize
2009 Queensland Premier's Prize
2009 New Yorker Notable Book of the Year
2009 Washington Post Book of the Year
2009 London Observer Book of the Year

Reviews
"The Australian"
"Publishers Weekly"
"New York Times"
 "... the savagery of the colonizing powers and further still the savagery of civilised society is laid bare for the reader to reflect upon. Flanagan’s writing style is masterful, grabbing the reader by the shoulders and forcing them to delve into their own ideologies and beliefs on good and evil, discipline and desire, right and wrong.'' "Booklover Book Reviews"
http://www.lemonde.fr/livres/article/2010/11/04/desirer-de-richard-flanagan_1435275_3260.html
http://www.latimes.com/entertainment/news/arts/la-ca-richard-flanagan10-2009may10,0,5098051.story

Interviews
Jason Steger in "The Age"
Ramona Kaval on "The Book Show"
Simon Bevilacqua in "The Mercury"
Sally Warhaft on "Slow TV"

References

External links
Wanting - at Penguin Books

2008 Australian novels
Novels by Richard Flanagan
Novels set in Tasmania